Sell Me The Answer is an Indian Malayalam game show which launched on Asianet channel worldwide which also features celebrities and singers. It was adapted from the British game show of the same title which was broadcast on Sky1 in the United Kingdom. Actor Mukesh is the host of the show.

Format 
The contestants need to answer ten questions to win 1,000,000 Indian Rupees. The contestants can buy the answer if any questions appeared non similar or wrong for them from the traders and those people sell their answer for a fixed amount from the contestant fixed within 10 seconds.

Season 1 
The first season comprised 84 episodes and ended on 12 November 2015. It was telecasted on Monday to Thursdays 8:00 pm to 9:00 pm. The show replaced popular game show Ningalkkum Aakaam Kodeeshwaran hosted by Suresh Gopi.
The season featured Film and television celebrities like:

 Dharmajan Bolgatty
 Shalu Kurian
 Kottayam Rasheed
 Sri Lakshmi
 Vivek Gopan
 Premi Vishwanath
 Mamukkoya
 Kalpana
 Rimy Tomy
 Indrans
 Gayathri Suresh
 Sethu Lakshmi
 Sithara
 Thesni Khan
 Dinesh Prabhakar
 Molly Kannamaly
 Manoj K. Jayan
 Asha Sarath
 Parvathy
 Tini Tom
 Ashokan
 Joju George
 Nadirshah
 M. G. Sreekumar

Season 2 
The second season of the series is launched on 4 April 2016 and ended on 1 September 2016 and was hosted by both Suraj Venjaramoodu and Mukesh separately.
Celebrity Guests:

 Swetha Mohan
 Pashanam Shaji
 Anusree
 Ansiba Hassan
 Suresh Thampanoor
 Noby
 Jayakumar Payyans
 Pashanam Shaji
 Arya Rohit
 Molly Kannamaly
 Master Gaurav Menon
 Baby Shreya
 Baby Meenakshi
 Sayanora Philip
 Job Kurien
 Saiju Kurup
 K. P. A. C. Lalitha
 Jayaraj Warrier
 Maniyanpilla Raju
 Kochu Preman
 Kalabhavan Shajohn
 Padmaraj Ratheesh
 Priyanka Nair
 Meera Nandan
 Ramesh Pisharody

Season 3 
The third season of the series premiered on 13 October 2018 and was hosted by Mukesh for the third time in a row. The show airs on Weekends at 9:00 P.M.

Celebrity guests:
 Sabumon Abdusamad
Miya George
Samyuktha Menon
Alina Padikkal
Aristo Suresh
Pashanam Shaji
Fr. Davis Chirammel
Kottayam Naseer
Jayaram
Rebecca Santhosh, Della George
Dhanya Mary Varghese, Reneesha
Rini Raj, Pradeep
Salim Kumar
Sayanora Philip
Sajan Surya, Mrudula
Siddharth, Haritha G Nair
Durga, Malavika
Harishankar, Annie Amie

External links 
 Official Website

References 

2016 Indian television series debuts
Malayalam-language television shows
Indian game shows
Indian reality television series
Asianet (TV channel) original programming